48P/Johnson is a periodic comet in the Solar System.

The comet nucleus is estimated to be 5.7 kilometers in diameter by Lamy, Fernandez, and Weaver. David C. Jewitt and Scott S. Sheppard estimate the nucleus to have dimensions of 6.0 x 4.4 km.

References

External links 
 Orbital simulation from JPL (Java) / Horizons Ephemeris
 48P at Kronk's Cometography
 48P/Johnson – Seiichi Yoshida @ aerith.net
 Lightcurve (Artyom Novichonok)

Periodic comets
0048

Comets in 2011
Comets in 2018
19490825